Gol Gumbaz, also written Gol Gumbad, is a 17th-century mausoleum located in Bijapur, a city in Karnataka, India. It houses the remains of Mohammad Adil Shah, seventh sultan of the Adil Shahi dynasty, and some of his relatives. Begun in the mid-17th century, the structure never reached completion. The mausoleum is notable for its scale and exceptionally large dome.

It is an important example of the southern regional style of Indo-Islamic architecture.

The building is one of those put by UNESCO on its "tentative list" to become a World Heritage Site in 2014, under the name Monuments and Forts of the Deccan Sultanate.

History 
The construction of the Gol Gumbaz began in the mid-17th century, during the close of Mohammad Adil Shah's reign, which was from 1627 to 1656. It is located directly behind the dargah of Hashim Pir, a Sufi saint; Richard Eaton views this as suggestive of the close relationship between the ruler and the saint. The mausoleum was never completed; construction may have halted in 1656 due to Mohammad Adil Shah's death that year.

Architecture
The Gol Gumbaz is one of the most ambitious structures built by the Adil Shahi dynasty. It is the most technically advanced domed structure to have been erected in the Deccan, and one of the largest single-chamber structures in the world. The architect of the structure is not known. Bianca Alfieri asserts that the building's size was a conscious decision made by Mohammad Adil Shah in order to rival the architecture of the Ibrahim Rauza, the tomb of the ruler's predecessor Ibrahim Adil Shah II. Alternatively, Elizabeth Merklinger suggests that the size was an attempt to assert the stature of the Adil Shahi dynasty, in light of its later absorption by the Mughal Empire. 

The mausoleum is contained in a larger walled complex, with other buildings such as a mosque, a naqqar khana, and a dharmshala.

Plan and exterior 

Despite the grand nature of the monument, the plan of the Gol Gumbaz is simple. It is a cube 47.5 m on each side, topped by a hemispherical dome of diameter approximately 44 m. domed octagonal towers, each divided into seven floors and topped by a bulbous dome, line the four corners of the cube. The levels of the towers are marked by arcades and contain staircases within. 

The walls of the structure are built of dark grey basalt and decorated plaster. Each side wall of the cube bears three blind arches; the spandrels of the arches contain medallion motifs, and the central arch on each side wall is filled with a stone screen containing doorways and windows. Cornices project from the building, supported by corbels. Atop the cornices are rows of small arches, themselves topped by large merlons. Leaves surround the base of the mausoleum's dome, hiding the joint between the dome and its drum.

Interior 

The interior is a huge single chamber that is approximately 41 m across and 60 m high. In the centre of the chamber floor is a raised platform bearing the cenotaphs of Mohammad Adil Shah, his younger wife Arus Bibi, his older wife, his favourite mistress Rhamba, his daughter, and a grandson. The cenotaphs mark the location of the actual tombs, which are found in a crypt underneath and accessed by a staircase under the western entrance of the mausoleum. Though typical of Indian Muslim tombs, this is the only instance of such a practice in Adil Shahi architecture. Mohammad Adil Shah's cenotaph is covered by a wooden canopy; Michell and Zebrowski speculate that this is a later addition. A half-octagonal room is attached to the north facade of the building, though this is also a later addition.

Dome 
At the time of its construction, the Gol Gumbaz boasted the largest dome in the Islamic world. Its external diameter is nearly 44 m. The dome is built of brick and cemented with layers of lime. It has six small openings in its base as well as a flat section at its crown. The dome rests on a circular base, which is internally supported by interlocking pendentives, formed from eight intersecting arches that arise from the interior hall. Similar vaulting is found, though on a smaller scale, in the Jami Masjid of Bijapur and the Ibrahim Rauza. Outside of Bijapur, this pendentive support system is virtually unknown. The conceptual origin of the Gol Gumbaz's pendentives is debated, though a Central Asian influence has been suggested by multiple scholars.

Around the base of the dome is a gallery, accessed by the staircases in the towers. It is known as the 'whispering gallery' since the faintest sound from here is heard across the dome, due to sound reflecting off the dome.

In Art and Literature
In Fisher's Drawing Room Scrap Book, 1833 is a picture of Gol Gumbaz entitled Tomb of Mahomed Shah by Samuel Prout, engraved by R. Sands and accompanied by a poetical illustration by Letitia Elizabeth Landon reflecting on the claim that he had a happy end.

Gallery

References

External links

Archaeological
 Gol Gumbad on  Survey of India website
 The Institute of Oriental Culture, University of Tokyo, Tokyo
Listen to unique sound recordings in Gol Gumbad: acoustics described
 Architectural features of Gol Gumbaz
Buildings and structures completed in 1659
Monuments and memorials in Karnataka
Adil Shahi dynasty
Domes
Tourist attractions in Bijapur district
Buildings and structures in Bijapur district
1650 establishments in Asia
Mausoleums in Karnataka
Tombs in Karnataka
Indo-Islamic architecture